There are tens of thousands of Sudanese refugees in Egypt, most of them seeking refuge from ongoing military conflicts  in their home country of Sudan. Their official status as refugees is highly disputed, and they have been subject to racial discrimination and police violence.

They live among a much larger population of Sudanese migrants in Egypt, more than 55000 people of Sudanese nationality (by most estimates; between 55000 and 77000 who live in Egypt. The U.S. Committee for Refugees and Immigrants believes many more of these migrants are in fact refugees, but see little benefit in seeking recognition.

Egypt employs a "shoot to stop" policy against refugees attempting to continue to Israel. According to Human Rights Watch, over 50 refugees, including women and children, have been shot by Egyptian border guards since 2007.

Background

The violent destabilization and economic collapse caused by the immense amount of death and destruction in Sudan has forced millions of civilians to flee their homes and cities. Many refugees currently residing in Egypt escaped from the Second Sudanese Civil War, where war "pitted black African separatists" and "Christians" against an "Arab government run by Muslim, northerners who had tried to impose Islamic law on the country." 1 in 5 Sudanese were killed in the war, and over 4 million civilians in the South have been given Internally Displaced Persons status. The majority of these IDPs are attempting to resettle outside of the country, but efforts have produced minimal results.

Legal status and conflicts
Almost one quarter of the refugees report that their experience with the UNHCR was their worst stressor since armed conflicts in Sudan.

Although Egypt is a founding signatory to both the 1951 Refugee Convention and the OAU Refugee Convention, the Egyptian government's lack of implementation and numerous conditions entered into the 1951 Convention substantially limit the rights of refugees in Egypt.

Throughout history, large numbers of Sudanese have lived in Egypt for long periods of time, often going back and forth between Egypt and Sudan.   Since the 1983 war in southern Sudan, followed by the 1989 coup, Egypt has become the preferred place of refuge for Sudanese.   Before 1995, the Wadi El Nil agreement between Sudan and Egypt, gave Sudanese unrestricted access to education, health services, property ownership, and employment.  However, with the assassination attempt on President Mubarak in Addis Abba in June 1995, allegedly performed by Sudanese Islamists, the Wadi El Nil agreement was abrogated, putting the rights of the Sudanese on par with any other foreigner.

Because of the Egyptian government's unwilling to implement the appropriate procedures for refugee status determination due to institutional and financial, as well as political reasons, United Nations High Commissioner for Refugees (UNHCR) began screening Sudanese applications for refugee status in 1995.  Due to Egypt's high unemployment rate and overall weak economic condition, domestic popular opinion is generally against permitting rights to Sudanese refugees (education, employment, property, etc.) because of the potential strain on the country's resources and infrastructure. As for the perspective from Egypt's national interests, to offer official refugee status to the Sudanese would indirectly censure the Sudanese government. Additionally, unlike Sudanese refugees, Palestinian refugees are not treated as typical asylum seekers that require a status determination process because of the sentiment of Arab solidarity with the Palestinian cause.

Since 1997, the increasing numbers of Sudanese refugees and insufficient living conditions of Egypt lead to greater focus on resettlement to third countries, usually Australia, Canada, the U.S. or Finland.   Out of the 67,000 Sudanese who claimed refugee status from the UNHCR office between 1997-March 2004, only about 20,700 were recognized.  Of those recognized, UNHCR resettled over 14,300 people .  Private sponsorships in addition to family reunification programs administered by the Australian and Canadian embassies have resettled an additional few thousand more.

UNHCR’s office in Cairo has a past of using a very limited interpretation of the refugee definition outlined in the 1951 Refugee Convention.  Although most of the Sudanese in Egypt fled due to war and violence, many were rejected refugee status because they were unable to prove a “well founded fear of persecution”.  Thus, between 1999 and 2003 only 33% of the Sudanese applying for refugee status in Egypt were recognized.   Since 2003, the percentage of Sudanese granted refugee status climbed substantially to about 60-63% as a result of UNHCR's expanded interpretation of the refugee definition in accordance with the OAU Convention.

The lack of refugee status and illegality results in the lack of employment access, education for children, health services, freedom of movement, and inability to claim justice.  As a recognized refugee, an individual receives international protection guaranteed by the host government and UNHCR mainly in the form of protection against expulsion and arrest:

In January 2004, Egyptian politicians wrote legislation for a  “Four Freedoms Agreement,” which would grant both Sudanese and Egyptians the freedom of movement, residence, ownership and work in either country. It would allow Sudanese nationals to enter Egypt without a visa to live indefinitely in Egypt without any special permits and no longer have to seek refugee status to remain in the country. The agreement would not enable Sudanese refugees to benefit from educational, medical, or social benefits entitled to native citizens. However, as of 2009, the agreement has yet to be ratified by the Egyptian government.

In light of the January 2011 referendum in which South Sudan voted overwhelmingly for independence, UNHCR has already begun creating contingency plans for a possible influx of Sudanese refugees in Egypt. Egyptian officials are expecting an increase of Sudanese refugees into Egypt as there are over one million Southern Sudanese residing in north Sudan, and the country's split could result in a mass departure from Khartoum.  Nevertheless, Egypt's poor track record of treatment toward Sudanese refugees makes it difficult to imagine the proper accommodation of a massive influx in the wake of possible post-referendum violence in Sudan.

With regards to Egyptian citizenship, refugees are barred from acquiring citizenship as Egyptian nationality is granted only on the basis of descent, or ius sanguinis.   This precludes the full integration of refugees in Egypt even for children of refugees born in Egypt.

Conditions in Egypt

Refugees in Egypt experience discrimination by both the government and civilian services. A series of laws passed by parliament has effectively stalled legal and financial gains for refugees of all nationalities, and the response by the international community has been limited.

Employment

Legal employment in Egypt is "virtually" impossible for Sudanese refugees. Refugees’ right to work is determined by Egypt's domestic legislation dealing with the employment of foreigners, law no. 137 of 1981, which decrees that refugees must apply for a work permit on par with any other foreigner.  Article 53 in the Egyptian Constitution gives the right of asylum to political refugees, however, only the few most prominent have been able to take advantage of this right like the Shah of Iran, Jaafar Nimeiri of Sudan, and the wife of the last king of Libya.

The 2003 Labor Law and its implementing Ministerial Decree and the 2004 Decree of the Ministry of Manpower and Emigration force all foreigners including refugees to have a permit to work in "gainful" employment. The requirements are reportedly very "stringent," and include assessments of legal status, employer sponsorship, and non-competition with nationals. In 2006, employers have since been required to submit a certificate verifying Sudanese nationals are not carrying AIDS. As a result of these requirements, only a fraction of Sudanese have obtained working permits.

For Sudanese, the cost of a work permit is about $40; however, they must prove they are uniquely qualified in order to get a work permit.

Housing

The large influx of Sudanese refugees in Egypt beginning in the late 1990s led to an increase in rent prices and a higher cost of living for refugees as well as social tensions between the natives and Sudanese not experienced during the past influxes in the 1980s.  The increased rent prices burdened the Sudanese refugees particularly because they must pay for more expensive furnished flats, unlike natives who have the right to own property.

Many refugees unable to afford the rent prices in Cairo live in the dismal conditions of Cairo's destitute neighborhoods or in impoverished areas on the outskirts of the city.  Refugee families also tend to share apartments to defray the cost of rent but the overcrowding and frequent visits of family members, which is common in Sudanese culture, has sometimes led to tension between Sudanese tenants and their Egyptian landlords.  Moreover, single women and mothers tend to face discrimination when seeking housing since many Egyptian landlords prefer renting to two-parent households due to social stigma.

Support agencies
The main agency is Caritas Egypt, which is responsible for assessing the needs of refugees and providing cash assistance, which is approximately 700 EGP every two months for a maximum of six months. Africa and Middle East Refugee Assistance provides legal aid and psychosocial services.

Education
Sudanese refugees endure a number of social, economic and political challenges in accessing education. The most acutely affected are those not recognized as refugees. Yet even for those registered with United Nations High Commissioner for Refugees (UNHCR), exercising their right to education is often impossible. A 2001 UNHCR case study highlighted concerns that UNHCR funding allocated for education was too low. Rather than being 'geared towards subsidising the status quo', the author advised that it should be 'geared towards fostering refugees' capacity to run their own lives'.

The report also called for all children to have access to public primary schools, as well as providing support and assistance obtaining secondary and postsecondary education through scholarships for students and grants to churches with learning centers.  Special attention was to be paid to integrating those children who had been out of education for several years. But this seems to have yielded little results because there was no modality put in place to follow up with the project.
As the matter of facts 75% of the Sudanese kids have no access to basic education and this explain why there is a recent rise in gangsterism of Sudanese youths in Egypt's capital Cairo.

 Almost ten years later in 2010, the UNHCR provided 7,000 education grants for registered refugees in Egypt—a relatively low number considering Egypt's burgeoning refugee population, of which the majority is Sudanese.

Legal framework
Egypt is party to a number of international conventions, including the 1951 Convention Relating to the Status of Refugees, the 1967 Casablanca Protocol (signed in 1981), and the 1989 UN Convention on the Rights of the Child.  Egypt acceded to the 1951 Convention in 1981 with a number of reservations. There are also bilateral agreements between the Egyptian and Sudanese governments, including the 1974 Nile Valley Agreement and the 2004 Four Freedoms Agreement and the 1974 Nile Valley Agreement, permitting free movement of goods and people across the border.

These commitments on paper have failed to translate into affording refugees sufficient protection or access to rights, including education.  Until recently, one of the reservations to the 1951 Convention referred to Article (22), which stipulated that refugees should receive the same treatment as nationals in accessing primary education.  In December 2000, the government passed a decree permitting recognized refugee children to enter public primary schools. Currently, the reality is that bureaucratic and social obstacles, ignorance and confusion over ministerial decrees deny Sudanese refugee and non-refugee children alike of their right to access education.

The role and procedures used by the UNHCR in determining the status of refugees in Egypt has been the source of occasional criticism from lawyers and refugee rights activists, notably Barbara Harrell-Bond and Michael Kagan.

Public schools
The Egyptian population has a 66% literacy rate
, which is an indication of its overburdened and inadequate education system.  In the past, it has suffered criticism for its emphasis on memorization and an inadequate national curriculum. Schools suffer from overcrowding, which makes finding a place in the appropriate grade in public schools difficult for both Egyptian and Sudanese children. Some schools operate shift systems, in order to accommodate a surplus of students, but in many schools the student-teacher ratio is 45 to 1, with even higher ratios in some inner-city schools.

Although Sudanese children were granted the right to free primary education in 2000, the cumbersome entry process for Sudanese children hinders access to public schools. The Egyptian Ministry of Education requires that Sudanese provide documentation from previous schools, a birth certificate and residency permit or iqama.  Residency permits are often too expensive for Sudanese families, and having spent their lives as IDPs in Sudan, many children do not have the necessary documentation.  For those children who are able to attend public primary schools, some are subject to bullying and harassment because of skin colour.

There are also problems for many, due to their socio-economic situation.  Teachers have noted that some children are unable to do their homework due to cramped living conditions and/or a lack of electricity at home.  Moreover, many Sudanese families live in small one-room apartments, with as many as seven or eight people in one residence.  Recently, the Danish embassy began funding a lunch program, as there was concern that children were coming to school hungry, without having been fed at home.

Secondary education is not free for Sudanese refugees.  Like foreigners, they must pay fees.

Refugee schools
The first refugee school was established in 1990 by Sudanese parents and teachers, and since then churches have become major service-providers for the Sudanese refugee population, particarly in the field of education.  After recognizing the difficulties Sudanese children faced in accessing free education, many churches established refugee schools.  There are three major learning centers for Sudanese refugees in Cairo providing primary education from kindergarten to tenth grade; namely Muwanga, Nusiriya and Afendiya, as well as several other smaller schools across the city.

Muwanga and Nusiriya schools abides by the Egyptian national curriculum, whereas Afendiya follows an American curriculum and teaches lessons in English.   These refugee schools face similar problems to public schools in terms of overcrowding.  In recent years, Muwanga school has seen its student body increase from 400 to 5000 students. Once again, socio-economic conditions prevent many students from entering refugee schools.  According to James Natale Finji, a principal of one of the schools, many of his students live in female-headed households, and most of the single mothers work as domestic servants, sometimes in distant cities, or they live in their employers' homes in Cairo. Their daughters sometimes drop out of school to care for their siblings.

Despite their popularity, Sudanese children attending these schools cannot obtain certificates recognized by the Egyptian or Sudanese governments.  Rather, children must sit a final examination in Egyptian public schools, set by the Ministry of Education. The registration process for these end of term examinations is problematic for Sudanese refugees, as it requires the submission of documentation and identification, as well as the expense of a residency permit or iqama.  As a result, many Sudanese children cannot advance beyond primary level education.  According to Sudanese sociologist, Jane Kani Edward, this requirement "...represents a planned and constructed strategy to deny southern Sudanese refugee children access to education and success.”

Childcare
Sudanese women in Cairo, particularly single mothers, are under pressure to work long hours in the informal economy as domestic workers.  In some situations, children are forced to travel to school unaccompanied.  Lack of childcare has also forced single mothers to leave their young children at home alone for hours at a time.  Others have resorted to enrolling their children in refugee schools, despite being underage. This also poses problems for school teachers, who are faced with large classes of children of various ages and abilities.

Higher Education
There is a relatively long history of higher education among Sudanese in Egypt, dating back to 1972.  Following the Addis Ababa Peace Agreement between the Egyptian government and the South Sudan Liberation Movement (SSLM), Sudanese students were granted free education in Egyptian universities under the 'Egyptian Scholarship for Sudanese Students' program. Between 1972 and 1982, 100 Sudanese students were granted scholarships each year.  After the redivision of administrative districts in the south during 1982, the number admitted on the scholarship program rose to 300 students each year.  This program was terminated in 1992. 
In recent years, higher education has become even less accessible for Sudanese students, as Egyptian universities have begun to charge refugee and foreign students high fees payable in hard currency.  Moreover, due to reduced funding and a shift in policy, the UNHCR in Cairo has been limited in its capacity to assist students.

Conflict with Authorities

When Hosni Mubarak became the president in 1981, regulations were established to allow police to arrest and detain suspects for an undetermined period of time. Incidences of police brutality during raids and protests have led to the arbitrary detention of Sudanese refugees and, in some cases, death.

"Black Day"

In the Maadi district in 2003, from January 27-29th, Egyptian police raided the residences of refugees from Sudan, Liberia and other African countries. Accounts of ill treatment such as discrimination and assault were reported by detainees–some of whom held refugee cards. A Liberian detainee reported:

According to the reports of other detained refugees, Egyptian police referred to the raid as "Black Day," labelling their intake sheets "Operation Track Down Blacks."

Mohandessin protests

An August 2004, Sudanese refugees, backed by the Egyptian non-governmental organisation SOUTH, mounted a protest against the issuing of yellow cards outside the UNHCR office. Police and security officers arrested and dispersed refugees with tear gas.

In October to December 2005, some 2,000 people participated daily in a protest camp in a park at a busy intersection in front of Mustafa Mahmoud Mosque. The camp was located in an upper middle class suburb where the UN High Commissioner for Refugees (UNHCR) has an office - protesting about conditions in Egypt and seeking to be resettled in another country. The camp had been formed on September 29, 2005, by several dozen people who organized with Refugee Voices, a Sudanese refugee group.  The Cairo office of UNHCR closed indefinitely in mid-November, after saying it was forced by the sit-in to suspend operations in October.

In the early hours of Friday, December 30, 2005, police raided the camp and clashes ensued in the presence of TV cameras and the press. They dragged the refugees across the street, pulled women from their hair and pushed the elderly carrying newborn babies. Refugees were put in public transit busses to be transferred to central security force camps in different locations in Egypt in addition to taking some of them to State security intelligence offices. Many of those taken to the camps suffered fractures and injuries and lack any medical help.

At least 28, and as many as 100, Sudanese migrants seeking refugee status were killed. At least one committed suicide in the wake of the raid.(FMRS 2006:37-38)  The camp was forcibly dismantled and 2,174 protesters were detained. The incident named later the "Mustapha Mahmoud Park Massacre" led many refugees to decide to seek shelter in Israel.

Shortly after the arrests, the Egyptian Foreign Ministry announced it would deport 645 of the arrested people as "illegal immigrants." In late January, the government agreed to allow the UNHCR to perform a status determination on those it wishes to deport. 165 refugee card holders were released from custody. 485 remain in custody at Al-Qanater Prison, Abu Zaabal Prison, and Shebeen Al-Kom and other detention centres.

See also
 Sudanese refugees in Israel
 Sudanese refugees in Chad
 St. Andrew's United Church in Cairo, a church and school serving mainly Sudanese refugees.
 Refugee kidnappings in Sinai

References

 Forced Migration and Refugee Studies program (FMRS) of the American University in Cairo, A TRAGEDY OF FAILURES AND FALSE EXPECTATIONS: Report on the Events Surrounding the Three-month Sit-in and Forced Removal of Sudanese Refugees in Cairo, September–December 2005, June 2006.
 Gamal Nkrumah, "The noose tightens," Al-Ahram Weekly, 5–11 January 2006.
 U.S. Committee for Refugees and Immigrants (USCRI), World Refugee Survey 2005.

External links 
 Al-Ahram: Why are increasing numbers of Sudanese refugees fleeing Egypt for Israel.

Ethnic groups in Egypt
Forced migration
Egypt
Egypt
Egypt–Sudan relations
Egypt–South Sudan relations